Qassar Khusayfah are a group of islets in Bahrain.

Administration
The island belongs to Muharraq Governorate .

Image gallery

References

Islands of Bahrain